A-Hmao, also known as Big Flowery Miao, are a Hmongic ethnic group in China. They are from Yunnan and Sichuan and also live in Guizhou. The number of persons within this group likely exceeds 400,000. They are speakers of the A-Hmao language, which belongs to the Hmong family.

Sources

See also 
Gha-Mu

Hmong
Ethnic groups in China
Ethnic groups in Yunnan
Ethnic groups in Sichuan